Kwon Seok-Geun(born May 8, 1983) is a South Korean football player who currently plays for Ansan Hallelujah.

Kwon previously played for Roasso Kumamoto.

References

External links

1983 births
Living people
South Korean footballers
J2 League players
Roasso Kumamoto players
K League 1 players
Korea National League players
Expatriate footballers in Japan
Association football midfielders